Health Advocate, Inc. is a US national health advocacy, patient advocacy and assistance company. The privately held company was founded in 2001 by former Aetna executives  and is headquartered in Plymouth Meeting, Pennsylvania, currently run by Teleperformance.  The company employs registered nurses, medical directors and benefits specialists who address a range of health care and health insurance issues.  Personal Health Advocates can help members locate providers, address errors on medical bills, answer questions about coverage denials and assist with insurance appeals.

The company's products include brands called Wellness Advocate, Benefits Gateway+Health Information Dashboards, EAP and Worklife, Pricing Decision Support, Personalized Health Communications, Chronic Care Management, and HR. The company offers a direct-to-consumer advocacy service, called Health Proponent to individuals who are not part of groups.

Products and services
Core advocacy
Clinical Assistance – medical and pharmaceutical advice and research.
Clinical Assistance helps members understand tests, treatments, and medications recommended or prescribed by physicians, facilitating the transfer of medical records, X-rays, and lab results before a scheduled appointment with a new physician, arranging for home-care equipment after discharge from a hospital, facilitating review of test results with another physician for confirmation of diagnosis, consolidating a multiple-day testing schedule for members with special needs, arranging hospice and other services for the terminally ill, facilitating transfer from a community hospital to a tertiary care facility.

Administrative Assistance helps resolve claims and benefits issues and helps find assistance outside the health plan.

Healthcare Advocates, Inc. vs Health Advocate, Inc.

In October 2004, Kevin Flynn, the sole employee of Healthcare Advocates Inc. and the latter company, which Flynn had formed in 1996, sued Health Advocate Inc. claiming trademark infringement and unfair competition. On 8 February 2005, the suit was dismissed on summary judgment by the United States District Court for the Eastern District of  Pennsylvania, upheld on appeal on 22 February 2006 by the United States Court of Appeal for the Third Circuit.

Coverage
Employers generally offer the service to their employees as a benefit and extension to their healthcare insurance plans. The employee's immediate family is also covered. This includes spouses, dependent children, parents, and parents-in-law.

Those whose employers do not offer the service can purchase it from Health Advocate's direct-to-consumer arm Health Proponent.

Awards
Ranked in Inc. (magazine) Top 5,000 Companies by Industry – Health: six years in a row (2006-2012)
2007 Ranked 3 in Inc. (magazine) Top 5,000 Companies by Metro Region—Philadelphia-Camden-Wilmington, PA-NJ-DE
2008 Inc. (magazine) 500: America's Fastest Growing Private Companies
2009 Inc. (magazine) 500: America's Fastest Growing Private Companies
Ranked in the Philadelphia 100 Fastest Growing Private Companies 6 years in a row (2006-2012), Philadelphia Business Journal/ Wharton Small Business Center,
2007 Top 20 Best Places to Work, Philadelphia Magazine
2008 CFO of the Year, Philadelphia Business Journal, Finalist
2009 CFO of the Year, Philadelphia Business Journal
Philadelphia Business Journal - 2009 Best Places to Work
2009 Eastern Technology Council - Life Sciences CEO of the Year - Mike Cardillo Winner
2010 IBPA Benjamin Franklin Award, Bill Fisher Award for Best First Book (non-fiction) – Martin Rosen and Abbie Leibowitz, M.D.

Published works
Rosen, Martin B. & Leibowitz, Abbie. “Health Advocacy Programs Help Employers and Employees Navigate Health Care and Insurance Systems.” Employee Benefit Plan Review Volume 57, Number 4, October 2002
Rosen, Martin B. & Leibowitz, Abbie. “Health Advocacy Helps Employers and Employees Cope with Health Care and Insurance Systems.” HIU Health Insurance Underwriter November 2002
Leibowitz, M.D., Abbie. “What Do Patient Advocates Do?” National Underwriter Vol. 3, No. 2, December 2003
Cardillo, Michael & Rosen, Martin. “Benefits, Challenges of Consumer-Driven Healthcare.” Human Capital January/ February 2004
Rosen, Martin B. & Leibowitz, M.D., Abbie. “Health Advocacy Helps Employers and Employees Cope with Healthcare and Insurance Systems.” Philadelphia SHRM Chapter News February 2004
Rosen, Martin B. & Leibowitz, M.D., Abbie. “Health Advocacy: Saving Time and Money for Employers and Employees.” Employee Benefits August 2004
Leibowitz, M.D., Abbie. “Health advocacy: Strategic complement to consumer-directed Healthcare.” Inside HR/NY September 2004
Leibowitz, M.D., F.A.A.P., Abbie. “The Role of Health Advocacy in Disease Management.” Disease Management Volume 8, Number 3 2005
Rosen, Martin. “Health Advocacy: A New resource for Employers.” Pension & Benefits Update Vol. 16, No. 3, March/ April 2005
Rosen, Martin B. “Health Advocacy: Saving Time and Money for Employers and Employees.” The Healthcare Savings Chronicle Volume 3 August 2005
Martin B. Rosen and Arthur “Abbie” Leibowitz, M.D. coauthored The Healthcare Survival Guide: Cost-Saving Options for the Suddenly Unemployed
Rosen, Martin B. “Simple Ways to Organize Your Older Relatives.” Buttoned Up 6 January 2010
Rosen, Martin B. “Top 10 Ways to manage Eldercare.” S.I. Parent March 2010
Chiaro MSW, LSW, Michelle. "The Role of Social Work in Health Advocacy." Social Work Today Newsletter August 2010

References

Companies based in Montgomery County, Pennsylvania
American companies established in 2001
2001 establishments in Pennsylvania
Health care companies established in 2001
Health care companies based in Pennsylvania
Privately held companies based in Pennsylvania
Health insurance in the United States